Neutral Protamine Hagedorn (NPH) insulin, also known as isophane insulin, is an intermediate-acting insulin given to help control blood sugar levels in people with diabetes. It is used by injection under the skin once to twice a day. Onset of effects is typically in 90 minutes and they last for 24 hours. Versions are available that come premixed with a short-acting insulin, such as regular insulin.

The common side effect is low blood sugar. Other side effects may include pain or skin changes at the sites of injection, low blood potassium, and allergic reactions. Use during pregnancy is relatively safe for the baby. NPH insulin is made by mixing regular insulin and protamine in exact proportions with zinc and phenol such that a neutral-pH is maintained and crystals form. There are human and pig insulin based versions.

Protamine insulin was first created in 1936 and NPH insulin in 1946. It is on the World Health Organization's List of Essential Medicines. NPH is an abbreviation for "neutral protamine Hagedorn". In 2020, insulin isophane was the 221st most commonly prescribed medication in the United States, with more than 2million prescriptions. In 2020, the combination of human insulin with insulin isophane was the 246th most commonly prescribed medication in the United States, with more than 1million prescriptions.

Medical uses

NPH insulin is cloudy and has an onset of 1–3 hours. Its peak is 6–8 hours and its duration is up to 24 hours.

It has an intermediate duration of action, meaning longer than that of regular and rapid-acting insulin, and shorter than long acting insulins (ultralente, glargine or detemir). A recent Cochrane systematic review compared the effects of NPH insulin to other insulin analogues (insulin detemir, insulin glargine, insulin degludec) in both children and adults with Type 1 diabetes. Insulin detemir appeared provide a lower risk of severe hyperglycemia compared to NPH insulin, however this finding was inconsistent across included studies. In the same review no other clinically significant differences were found between different insulin analogues in either adults nor children.

History
Hans Christian Hagedorn (1888–1971) and August Krogh (1874–1949) obtained the rights for insulin from Banting and Best in Toronto, Canada. In 1923 they formed Nordisk Insulin laboratorium, and in 1926 with August Kongsted he obtained a Danish Royal Charter as a non-profit foundation.

In 1936, Hagedorn and B. Norman Jensen discovered that the effects of injected insulin could be prolonged by the addition of protamine obtained from the "milt" or semen of river trout. The insulin would be added to the protamine, but the solution would have to be brought to pH 7 for injection. University of Toronto, Canada later licensed protamine zinc insulin (PZI), to several manufacturers. This mixture only needs to be shaken before injection. The effects of PZI lasted for 24–36 h.

In 1946, Nordisk was able to form crystals of protamine and insulin and marketed it in 1950, as neutral protamine Hagedorn (NPH) insulin. NPH insulin has the advantage that it can be mixed with an insulin that has a faster onset to complement its longer lasting action.

Eventually all animal insulins made by Novo Nordisk were replaced by synthetic, recombinant 'human' insulin. Synthetic 'human' insulin is also complexed with protamine to form NPH.

Timeline
The timeline is as follows:
 1926 Nordisk receives Danish charter to produce insulin
 1936 Hagedorn discovers that adding protamine to insulin prolongs the effect of insulin
 1936 Canadians D.M. Scott and A.M. Fisher formulate zinc insulin mixture and license to Novo
 1946 Nordisk crystallizes a protamine and insulin mixture
 1950 Nordisk markets NPH insulin
 1953 Nordisk markets "Lente" zinc insulin mixtures.

Society and culture

Names 

NPH stands for neutral protamine Hagedorn, and the words refer to neutral pH (pH = 7), protamine (a protein), and Hans Christian Hagedorn (an insulin researcher).Brand names include Humulin N, Novolin N, Novolin NPH, Gensulin N, SciLin N, Insulatard, and NPH Iletin II.

See also
 Insulin analogue

References

Insulin therapies
Human proteins
Recombinant proteins
Peptide hormones
Eli Lilly and Company brands
World Health Organization essential medicines
Wikipedia medicine articles ready to translate
Medical mnemonics